St. Anthony-on-Hudson Seminary was a Roman Catholic seminary in Rensselaer, New York. It was run by the Franciscans and closed in 1989.  It was housed in Beverwyck Manor.

Notable alumni
Cardinal Peter Turkson, Archbishop of Cape Coast
Gregory John Hartmayer, Archbishop of Atlanta

References

Defunct private universities and colleges in New York (state)
Defunct Catholic universities and colleges in the United States
Catholic seminaries in the United States
Seminaries and theological colleges in New York (state)
Educational institutions established in 1912
Educational institutions disestablished in 1989
Catholic universities and colleges in New York (state)
1912 establishments in New York (state)